Lazcano, also spelled Lazkano, is a variant of the name of the Spanish Basque town of Lazkao.

Notable people named Lazcano or Lazkano
Alejandra Lazcano, Mexican actress
Antonio Lazcano, Mexican biologist
Heriberto Lazcano Lazcano, Mexican drug trafficker and leader of Los Zetas
Jaime Lazcano, Spanish footballer
Jesús Mari Lazkano, Spanish painter
Juan Lazcano, Mexican-American boxer
Jorge Marchant Lazcano, Chilean writer
Ramon Lazkano, Spanish composer and conductor

See also 
Lazkao Txiki, legendary bertsolari (Basque-language impromptu poet)
Lascano (surname)

Surnames of Basque origin